Cyperus imbricatus, also known as the shingle flatsedge, is a species of sedge that is native to sub-tropical and tropical areas of the world.

The sedge is a rhizomatous, robust and perennial sedge with a natural distribution through pantropical areas that is also known as an agricultural and environmental weed.

See also
List of Cyperus species

References

imbricatus
Plants described in 1788
Flora of Afghanistan
Flora of Angola
Flora of Bangladesh
Flora of Belize
Flora of Benin
Flora of Bolivia
Flora of Borneo
Flora of Botswana
Flora of Brazil
Flora of Cameroon
Flora of the Central African Republic
Flora of Chad
Flora of China
Flora of Colombia
Flora of the Republic of the Congo
Flora of Costa Rica
Flora of Cuba
Flora of the Dominican Republic
Flora of Ecuador
Flora of El Salvador
Flora of Egypt
Flora of Ethiopia
Flora of Ghana
Flora of Gabon
Flora of Guatemala
Flora of Guinea
Flora of Guyana
Flora of Haiti
Flora of Honduras
Flora of India
Flora of Iran
Flora of Ivory Coast
Flora of Jamaica
Flora of South Africa
Flora of Laos
Flora of Liberia
Flora of Madagascar
Flora of Malawi
Flora of Malaysia
Flora of Mali
Flora of Mauritania
Flora of Mexico
Flora of Mozambique
Flora of Myanmar
Flora of Namibia
Flora of Nepal
Flora of New Guinea
Flora of Nicaragua
Flora of Niger
Flora of Nigeria
Flora of Pakistan
Flora of Peru
Flora of Panama
Flora of the Philippines
Flora of Puerto Rico
Flora of Senegal
Flora of Sudan
Flora of Indonesia
Flora of Taiwan
Flora of Tanzania
Flora of Thailand
Flora of Togo
Flora of Uganda
Flora of Venezuela
Flora of Vietnam
Flora of Zambia
Flora of the Democratic Republic of the Congo
Flora of Zimbabwe
Taxa named by Anders Jahan Retzius